Wayne Township is a township in Mitchell County, Iowa, United States.

History
Wayne Township was first settled in 1853.

References

Townships in Mitchell County, Iowa
Townships in Iowa